Simkuiyeh (also Romanized as Sīmkū’īyeh; also known as Semkūeeyeh) is a village in Asfyj Rural District, Asfyj District, Behabad County, Yazd Province, Iran. At the 2006 census, its population was 143, in 40 families.

References 

Populated places in Behabad County